Roy Padilla may refer to:

Roy Padilla Sr. (1926–1988), Filipino politician
Roy Padilla (footballer) (born 1963), Honduran footballer